Dele Sunday Alampasu (born 24 December 1996) is a Nigerian professional footballer who plays for Pietà Hotspurs in the Maltese Premier League, as a goalkeeper.

Club career
Alampasu began his career in Nigeria, playing in the Lagos State Football Association Future Stars Academy and for Abuja Football College. Alampasu underwent trials with Real Oviedo, Genk and Braga before signing for Portuguese club Estoril in February 2015. Alampasu cancelled his contract with Estoril, due to visa problems, and subsequently signed for Feirense.

In August 2016, Alampasu signed for Cesarense on loan. On 20 January 2019, Alampasu made his debut for Feirense in a 0–0 draw against Rio Ave.

In February 2020, Alampasu signed for Latvian club Ventspils.

International career
In 2013, Alampasu represented Nigeria U17 at the 2013 FIFA U-17 World Cup, winning the Golden Glove award, as the Golden Eaglets won their fourth U17 World Cup.

On 1 June 2017, Alampasu made his senior debut for Nigeria, as a 70th minute substitution, against Togo in a 3–0 victory.

Honours
Nigeria U17
FIFA U-17 World Cup: 2013

Individual
FIFA U-17 World Cup Golden Glove: 2013

References

1996 births
Living people
People from Abuja
Nigerian footballers
Nigerian expatriate footballers
C.D. Feirense players
Association football goalkeepers
Nigerian expatriate sportspeople in Portugal
Expatriate footballers in Portugal
Nigeria international footballers
Nigeria under-20 international footballers
Nigeria youth international footballers
Primeira Liga players
FK Ventspils players
Expatriate footballers in Latvia
Nigerian expatriate sportspeople in Latvia
Nigeria A' international footballers
2014 African Nations Championship players